is a Japanese musician, singer-songwriter, record producer and illustrator who began releasing Vocaloid music under the stage name  in 2009. In 2012, he debuted under his real name, releasing music with his own voice. He has sold at least 4.2 million physical copies and more than 7 million digital copies in Japan.

Biography

Early musical career 
Kenshi Yonezu was born on March 10, 1991, in the rural part of Tokushima, Japan. As a child, Yonezu found it difficult to communicate with other people, especially his father. Yonezu typically felt that his mother understood him. He was diagnosed with autism after the age of 20.

Yonezu's first foray into music was in 2006 during his second year of junior high school, where he formed a band with his friend Hiroshi Nakajima, called Late Rabbit Edda, to play for the school culture festival. He worked as the vocalist, songwriter and occasional guitarist, while Nakajima was the guitarist. In late 2007, he set up a website for the band, posting song lyrics and short novels. Yonezu wrote songs for the band, and between April 2008 and March 2009 uploaded 24 original songs to video sharing website Nico Nico Douga using the name Hachi. None of the songs were widely viewed, with the greatest, "Beelzebub," receiving only 23,000 views. Yonezu created his blog in this period, and called it .

Yonezu moved to Osaka after high school, and started attending a fine arts school. While a student there, he started uploading songs using Vocaloid software Hatsune Miku instead, which were increasingly popular. His 2009 song  was his first song to receive over 1,000,000 views on the site. Though Yonezu had uploaded over 30 songs sung by himself, he deleted them when his Vocaloid songs became more popular. Yonezu renamed his blog , and it was one of five blogs awarded the Diamond Award at the 2009 WebMoney Awards.

In December 2009, Yonezu's song "Clock Lock Works" was featured on an Exit Tunes compilation album, Supernova, the first time a song of his appeared on an album. In January, "Musunde Hiraite Rasetsu to Mukuro" was featured on Vocalolegend feat. Hatsune Miku, Exit Tunes' second Oricon top 10 compilation album. Yonezu released two self-produced albums in 2010: Hanataba to Suisō in February, and Official Orange in November. In 2010 and 2011, Yonezu's songs were featured on many Exit Tunes albums, including Vocalonexus feat. Hatsune Miku, which was the second Vocaloid album to reach number one on Oricon's albums chart. His songs were featured on the games Hatsune Miku: Project DIVA Extend (2011) and Hatsune Miku: Project DIVA F (2012), and in the Hatsune Miku concert Miku no Hi Dankanshasai (2012), which became the first number one DVD/Blu-ray for a virtual singer. On Hachi's Nico Nico account, seven of his songs have been viewed more than 1,000,000 times, including the song "Matryoshka," which had reached 5,000,000 views by 2012.

In April 2010, Yonezu joined the animation collective , a group that he had worked with since his "Clock Lock Works" video in November 2009. On January 23, 2011, Yonezu uploaded his final Hachi Vocaloid video for approximately three years.

Late Rabbit Edda remained active until 2010. They were renamed Ernst Eckman, and added a drummer called Sumimoto to their line up. As Ernst Eckman, they released a single song on MySpace, . Yonezu began to feel that he did not work well with other people, and decided to work alone on Vocaloid songs exclusively, giving up on being a part of a band.

Major label debut 

In March 2011, Yonezu and seven other musicians created Balloom, an independent music label for Internet musicians to widen their musical opportunities. His debut album released in 2012, Diorama, debuted at number 6 and sold over 45,000 copies, becoming the biggest release on the label to date. The album was one of the winners of the 5th CD Shop Awards, an award voted on by music store personnel. Yonezu was picked up as a major label artist under Universal Sigma, and debuted in May 2013 with the single "Santa Maria." He made the shift in order to work with musicians doing similar things as him.

On October 28, 2013, Yonezu released his first Vocaloid song in two and a half years, using a live band and the vocal Gumi. Kenshi Yonezu released his second album, Yankee, on April 23, 2014, followed by the first concert in his career on June 27. Yonezu's song "Eine Kleine" was written for Tokyo Metro to be used in its 2014 commercial campaign.

Yonezu continued to rise in popularity with the release of albums Bremen in 2015 and Bootleg in 2017. Driven by hit singles "Uchiage Hanabi", "Loser," "Orion," and "Peace Sign," Bootleg won Album of the Year at the 60th Japan Record Awards and shot Yonezu to national stardom.

On December 31, 2018, Yonezu made his live television debut on the 69th NHK Kōhaku Uta Gassen, the annual year-end extravaganza and one of Japan's most prestigious music programs. He performed his 2018 hit Lemon live from his native Tokushima, marking the first time a segment of the Kōhaku Uta Gassen was broadcast from Tokushima Prefecture. The songs Uchiage Hanabi and Paprika, both produced by Yonezu, were also performed at the event.

In 2019, Yonezu wrote the song "Machigaisagashi" for singer Masaki Suda; it won Best Pop Video at the 2019 MTV Video Music Awards Japan. When Billboard Japan published its year-end charts, "Uma to Shika" and "Machigaisagashi" ranked fifth and sixth respectively. Yonezu won the Special Award at the 61st Japan Record Awards held on December 30, and "Paprika" won the Grand Prix. The great influence of Kenshi also extends to Greater China, he held his first overseas concerts in China and Taiwan in 2019.

Yonezu co-wrote the song "Kite" for Japanese boy band Arashi, which served as the theme song for NHK's coverage of the 2020 Summer Olympics. On August 7, 2020, he performed during Fortnite's Party Royale, singing songs from his latest album Stray Sheep (2020), which had been released two days prior. In December, he became one of five recipients of the Special Achievement Award at the 62nd Japan Record Awards. In 2022, Yonezu released "Kick Back", which was used as the opening theme song for the anime series Chainsaw Man.

Artistry 

Yonezu writes and composes all of his music. In his Vocaloid songs as well as his independent album Diorama, he also arranged, programmed, mixed and performed all of the instruments by himself. When he moved to Universal, Yonezu began working with a band to perform his music. Yonezu considers Japanese bands Bump of Chicken, Asian Kung-Fu Generation and Radwimps big influences on his work, and Japanese authors Kenji Miyazawa and Yukio Mishima on his lyrics. As an illustrator, he feels inspired by Edward Gorey's illustrations. Yonezu generally composes songs on the guitar, but also occasionally uses drums to work out a melody.

Yonezu separates his musical career in two, releasing music using Vocaloids as Hachi, and music using his own voice as Kenshi Yonezu. He feels that music made as Hachi was created for the Nico Nico Douga community, while songs under his real name do not have such a strong tie. While he did not want to record covers of his Vocaloid songs during sessions for Diorama (2012), he felt the difference between Kenshi Yonezu songs and Hachi songs blur during sessions for Yankee (2014), and recorded a self-cover of "Donut Hole."

 (officially "DUNE" in English) is a song composed and arranged by Hachi after his long absence in VOCALOID music scene since his previous work, "Donut Hole". This is a theme song for Hatsune Miku Magical Mirai 2017 and featured on "Magical Mirai 2017 Official Album". It has entered the Hall of Legend on Niconico and rapidly surpassed 1 million views on YouTube shortly after its upload.

He has worked as a producer for other musicians several times. The first song he composed and arranged was Internet singer Lasah's  in 2010. He composed and produced the song  for anime singer LiSA on her mini-album Letters to U (2011). He also worked on a remix for the ending theme song of the anime Anohana: The Flower We Saw That Day, "Secret Base (Kimi ga Kureta Mono) (Those Dizzy Days Ver.)," which was released in 2013.

Despite holding an online live performance on Ustream every month, Yonezu does not perform live often. His high school band, Late Rabbit Edda, performed live once on August 26, 2008, and applied to perform in the Senkō Riot teenage music contest. The band passed the demo tape round, but failed to make it through the studio live judging and onto the final live competition. Yonezu also performed as Hachi in several Vocaloid events. Despite debuting his solo career in 2012, he did not hold any live performances for two years. His first concert was planned for June 27, 2014, two months after the release of Yankee.

Yonezu illustrated all of his early Nico Nico Douga videos, using a scanner or a pen tablet to draw imagery. When his parents bought a computer when he was 10, Yonezu made and uploaded flash animation videos for Bump of Chicken songs on the Internet. He continued to illustrate for his album Diorama, creating the music videos and the cover artwork by himself, and with the help of fellow members of Minakata Kenkyūjo. His Universal releases have also featured his own artwork. Yonezu primarily uses Adobe Photoshop Elements, Adobe After Effects and Corel Painter Essentials for animation. Yonezu's illustrations became a feature in music magazine Rockin' On Japan starting in the August 2013 issue. His piece, called , features fictional creatures Yonezu has drawn.

For creating songs, Yonezu uses music software Cakewalk Sonar. When he started to create Vocaloid music, he used Vocaloid 2 software, and Hatsune Miku vocals exclusively. However, in 2010, Yonezu began using Megurine Luka and Gumi in his songs as well. His album Hanataba to Suisō features Hatsune Miku only, whereas Official Orange features Hatsune Miku, Megurine Luka, Gumi, as well as his own vocals on the song .

He answered on a radio program that Susumu Hirasawa's "MOTHER," which he listened to before he was 18 years old when he started his music career, was "one of the songs that changed my life," and said, "All of Susumu Hirasawa's songs have a musicality that I had never heard before, and I was very influenced by them. Yonezu said he learned about Susumu Hirasawa from Nico Nico Douga, and said, "This song 'MOTHER' is really new music that I've never heard before, but I feel nostalgia and nostalgia in it. I thought there was something universal about it." "I thought it was music with an amazing sense of balance, and for the first time, I thought I would cherish that sense of balance in my own music. Chris Peppler, the MC of the radio show and star of "Kamen Rider Drive," asked me, "Would you like to meet him?" Yonezu replied, "On the contrary, I don't want to meet someone I really respect."

Discography

 Diorama (2012)
 Yankee (2014)
 Bremen (2015)
 Bootleg (2017)
 Stray Sheep (2020)

Awards and nominations

Notes

References

External links 

 

1991 births
Crunchyroll Anime Awards winners
Living people
Japanese illustrators
Japanese male pop singers
Japanese male singer-songwriters
Musicians from Tokushima Prefecture
Universal Music Japan artists
Vocaloid musicians
21st-century Japanese male singers
People on the autism spectrum
People with Marfan syndrome